Bashir Al-Fellah (born 1960) is a Libyan sprinter. He competed in the men's 4 × 400 metres relay at the 1980 Summer Olympics.

References

1960 births
Living people
Athletes (track and field) at the 1980 Summer Olympics
Libyan male sprinters
Olympic athletes of Libya
Place of birth missing (living people)